Knickerbocker, also spelled Knikkerbakker, Knikkerbacker, and Knickerbacker, is a surname that dates back to the early settlers of New Netherland that was popularized by Washington Irving in 1809 when he published his satirical A History of New York under the pseudonym "Diedrich Knickerbocker". The name was also a term for Manhattan's aristocracy "in the early days" and became a general term, now obsolete, for a New Yorker.

Notable people with the surname
 Austin Knickerbocker (1918–1997), American professional baseball player
 Brianna Knickerbocker (born 1982), American voice actress 
 Bill Knickerbocker (1911–1963), American professional baseball player
 David Buel Knickerbacker (1833–1894), 3rd Protestant Episcopal bishop of the diocese of Indiana
 Harmen Jansen Knickerbocker (c. 1650 – c. 1720), Dutch colonist in New Netherland (New York)
Hubert Renfro Knickerbocker (1898–1949), American writer and journalist
 Herman Knickerbocker (1779–1855), United States Representative
 Hubert Renfro Knickerbocker (1898–1949), American writer and journalist
 I. B. Knickerbocker (1864–1954) American politician in the state of Washington 
 Jerry Knickerbocker (born 1943), American politician in the state of Minnesota
 Charles Knickerbocker Harley (born 1943), academic economic historian

Pseudonymously
 Cholly Knickerbocker, a pseudonym used by a series of society columnists writing for the New York American and the New York Journal-American
 Diedrich Knickerbocker, a pseudonym of Washington Irving
 Suzy Knickerbocker, a pseudonym for columnist Aileen Mehle

References

English-language surnames
Dutch-language surnames
Americanized surnames
Washington Irving